The Gizmos were an American punk band formed in Bloomington, Indiana, United States, in 1976. The original band was made up of Ken Highland, Eddie Flowers, Ted Niemiec and the members of a group called Cerberus; Rich Coffee, Dave Sulak, Rick Czajka, and Jim DeVries. The Gizmos released three 7-inch EPs on Gulcher Records in 1976, 1977, and 1978.

In late 1977 the band broke up.  Then, Ted Niemiec recruited new members to form a new version of the Gizmos.  This version of the band released one EP, "Never Mind The Sex Pistols Here's The Gizmos".

After Niemiec left the band, new member Dale Lawrence carried on using the band name with new members.

After the Gizmos
Ken Highland later relocated to Boston, Massachusetts, where he has been in a long string of garage-oriented bands over the years, including Club Linehan a Go-Go, the Hopelessly Obscure, Johnny & the Jumper Cables, the Kenne Highland Clan, the Goody Goody Gumdrops, and the Vatican Sex Kittens.

Eddie Flowers and Rich Coffee moved to Los Angeles in the late 1970s and become active in the underground rock scene there. Flowers started Crawlspace with members of the Lazy Cowgirls in 1985. Coffee sang and played in Thee Fourgiven and the Tommyknockers, influenced by late 1960s pre-punk hard rock bands like the MC5 and the Doors as well as more recent acts like the Cramps, the Gun Club, and Billy Childish. The bands of both Coffee and Flowers were associated with the Sympathy for the Record Industry record label.

Members

Cerberus
Rich Coffee — guitar, vocals
Rick Czajka — guitar
Dave Sulak — bass
Jim DeVries — drums

Gizmos #1
Ken Highland — lead guitar, lead vocals
Eddie Flowers — lead vocals
Ted Niemiec — lead vocals
Rich Coffee — rhythm guitar, background vocals
Dave Sulak — bass
Rick Czajka — rhythm/lead guitar (EP1 only)
Davey Medlock — background vocals
Don Jaskulske — background vocals
Jim DeVries — drums #1
Jim Kohl — drums #2

Gizmos #2
Ted Niemiec — lead vocals
Dale Lawrence — rhythm guitar
Steve Feikes — rhythm guitar
Billy Nightshade — bass
Phil Hundley — tambourine, background vocals, percussion
Shadow Myers — drums
Don Jaskulske — background vocals

Gizmos #3 
This version of the Gizmos was one of the first corn punk bands in the U.S.
Dale Lawrence — vocals, rhythm guitar
Billy Nightshade — bass, vocals
Tim Carroll — guitar
Shadow Myers — drums #1
Crash Kinser — drums #2
Robbie Wise — drums #3

Gizmos #4
This is a re-union of the original 1976 line up.
Main members
Ken Highland — lead guitar, lead vocals
Eddie Flowers — lead vocals
Ted Niemiec — lead vocals
Rich Coffee — rhythm guitar, background vocals
Davey Medlock — background vocals
Rhythm section #1
Ian Brewer — guitar
John Terrill — drums
Max Demata — bass
Rhythm section #2
Craig Bell — bass
Kelsey Simpson — drums
Sam Murphy — guitar
Rhythm section #3
Kenny Kaiser — guitar
MJ Quirk — bass
Matt Burns — drums

Discography

EPs
Gizmos #1
"Muff Divin'" EP (1976)
"Amerika First" EP (1977)
"World Tour" EP (1978)

Gizmos #2
"Never Mind The Sex Pistols Here's The Gizmos" EP (1978)

Gizmos #3
Hoosier Hysteria! (Split album with Dow Jones and the Industrials) (1980)

Compilations
1975-1977: Demos & Rehearsals (2000) - Gizmos #1
1976: The Rockabilly Yobs Session (2001) - Gizmos #1
The Midwest Can Be Allright (2001) - Gizmos #3
1978-1981:Never Mind The Gizmos Here's The Gizmos (2002) - Gizmos #2 and #3
Rock & Roll Don't Come From New York (2004) - Gizmos #3
1976/1977: The Studio Recordings (2006) - Gizmos #1

References

External links

1977 Gizmos article from Big Star fanzine: http://ffanzeen.blogspot.com/2012/05/the-gizmos-quims-queens-teens-and.html
Ken Highland interview 1978: http://www.bostongroupienews.com/BGNGizmoInterview.htm
JOJOBLOG #24 The Bostonians- Kenne Highland and Jody Moore; http://jojofiles.blogspot.com/2010/01/bostonians-interview-24-kenne-highland.html
Eddie Flowers interview at Perfect Sounds Forever: http://www.furious.com/perfect/gizmos.html
Eddie Flowers website: http://www.slippytown.com

Punk rock groups from Indiana
Sympathy for the Record Industry artists